Jonaicha Khurd is a village of the tehsil Neemrana and the district Alwar of Rajasthan state in India with a population around 3000. Khurd and Kalan are Persian language words which mean small and big respectively when two villages have same name then one is distinguished as Kalan (big) and the other Khurd (small) with the village name.

Location
It is located 5 km inside of the north-eastern border Rajasthan-Haryana. This village is the "Tapobhumi" of Baba Kundandas Maharaj, one of the greatest saints of the area. Its distance to National Highway number 8 (NH-8) at Shahajahanpur is 3 km. It is connected with all major metro cities of India like New Delhi (120 km), Gurgaon (80 km), Jaipur (152 km), Mumbai (1050 km), Kolkata (1400 km) and Chennai (2000 km) by the best roads of country, National Highways of India. Indira Gandhi International Airport, New Delhi, is 100 km from this village, and the nearest railway station Bawal is 20 km away. Joniacha Khurd is surrounded by Bani Jonaicha in the south, Sanseri and Jonaicha Kalan in the west, Gugalkota in the east and Khandoda (Haryana) in the north. One of the major tourist and industrial spots of the area, Neemrana, is located 8 km from this village.

Baba Kundan Das Ji Maharaj
Jonaicha Khurd is the proud "Karmbhumi" and "Tapobhumi" of Baba Kundan Das Ji Maharaj. He was a great soul with many paranormal powers including Samadhi which he earned by practicing yoga. Today the "Dhuna" of Baba is a temple and fabulous place to visit. It is in the center of village both in terms of location and social activities. Important meetings, political gatherings, and "Keertans" usually take place here including annual fairs. Married couples start their married life not before taking blessings of the holy saint. An annual fair is held on the 6th (chhath) of Hindi month Bhadrapad in the memory of that great saint. Many sports competition such as wrestling (all India level, witnessing the participation of many national level wrestlers), kabaddi, and volleyball are major attractions of the fair.

Vedic Vankhandi Aashram 
The ancient Indian teaching system and the vedic ashram concept are still alive in this village. This ashram has a vast lush green area including fruit trees, medicinal herbs and various other plants. The ashram is open for everyone in terms of its resources and accessibility. People from all ages, castes and religions visit this place frequently in search of mental peace and good health.

Education 
Jonaicha Khurd has a leading place in education in Neemrana tehsil with an above national average literacy rate. It has one government senior secondary coeducation school and several good private schools. The level of education and awareness have risen in recent years

Political situation 
Jonaicha Khurd falls under the Alwar constituency of Loksabha of Indian parliament  and under the Mundawar constituency of the state legislative assembly Vidhansabha. Until 2007 it belonged to the Behror legislative assembly seat and to Mundawar thereafter. It falls under Neemrana panchayat smiti and is the headquarter of Jonaicha Khurd Panchayat. Currently both Loksabha (Alwar) and Vidhansabha (Mundawar) seats are held by the Bhartiya Janta Party.

Economy 
Earlier, the economy of Jonaicha Khurd was based mainly on agriculture and government jobs predominantly in teaching, army and police services. Since the last few years this trend is undergoing a change because of the less remunerative nature of agriculture and more awareness about the importance of education. Now major contributing factors of the economy of this village are government and industrial jobs, business, and agriculture. The proximity to various industrial hubs like Gurgaon, Shahajahanpur, Neemrana, Behror, Bhiwadi, Khushkhera, and Alwar provides many jobs. The turnaround in the infrastructure of the village, especially telephone and road connectivity, coupled with the availability of electricity, have changed the very image of an Indian village. This is in turn resulting in a higher family income and living standards.

Culture 
The culture of the village has a vast influence of Haryana, which is no surprise because of its location on the Haryana-Rajasthan border. Rath is the main spoken language as of most of the Rath area. It comes close to the Haryanvi language. Jonaicha Khurd is a village of 100% Hindu population; hence the culture involves all Hindu festivals and rituals. The festival of light Deepawali, the colorful festival of Holi and the annual fairs are among the most awaited festivals. Since 1999 Jonaicha Khurd has hosted an annual multi-team cricket event, the  Akhil Bharatiya (all India) Baba Kundandas Smriti Cricket Pratiyogita (competition). Usually this event starts a few days before Diwali with a final on the great festival of light. Villagers take all the responsibilities related with this competition including expenses and other preparations.

References

Villages in Alwar district